Thaxter is a surname. Notable people with the surname include:
 Celia Thaxter (1835–1894), American writer of poetry and stories
 Edward Thaxter Gignoux (1916–1988), United States federal judge
 John Thaxter (1927–2012), British theatre critic
 Phyllis Thaxter (1919–2012), American actress
 Roland Thaxter (1858–1932), American mycologist, the son of Celia Thaxter and Levi Thaxter
 Samuel Thaxter (1665–1740), colonel and magistrate in Plymouth, New England
 Winfred Thaxter Denison (1873–1919), United States Assistant Attorney General and Secretary of the Interior

English-language surnames
Occupational surnames